The Desert Valley Charitable Foundation was founded in 1989. The Foundation was established by Prem Reddy, MD, a cardiologist and philanthropist with an initial gift of $1 million. Since that time, he has contributed over $5 million to the Foundation. 

The Desert Valley Charitable Foundation is a 501(c)(3) not-for-profit charitable organization that serves the health care needs of the High Desert communities in many ways, including a free public health library, a scholarship program for students in the health care field, and the support of other health care related charities.

References

External links
 Medical Dreams Come Alive Through Scholarship Program
 Scholarship Awarded for 9/11 Memorial Design
 Presidential Scholar Graduates in Just Three Years
 Fruits of donation - Dr. Prem Reddy School of Health Sciences
 Dr. Prem Reddy Honored for Donation
 Largest Donation in College History
 The Helping Hands of Desert Valley Charitable Foundation
 Gov. Pete Wilson lays cornerstone for Desert Valley Library
 Art Reflects Intent to Lend Helping Hands
 Desert Valley Charitable Foundation

Medical and health foundations in the United States
Organizations established in 1989